Let It Be is an EP released by American comedy metal/punk act Green Jellö in 1984.

Recording and release

The EP was recorded in Bill Manspeaker's bedroom and at a local band rehearsal hall and put out as a DIY Release on a 7" Vinyl disc via the band's own label American Jello Parti Productions, Inc. The title and the cover artwork is a parody of The Beatles' Let It Be album cover. The back cover of the picture sleeve features an actual endorsement from Kiss member Paul Stanley. The record also included a multi-panel lyric sheet. Let It Be was limited to 500 copies only. The first 100 copies were housed in a hand-glued color cardboard picture sleeve printed on photographic paper. The other 400 picture sleeves were simply a green tinted photocopy of the original cardboard sleeve.

Track listing

Personnel
 Moronic Dicktator (Bill Manspeaker) - lead vocals, artwork
 Marshall Stack (Jim Laspesa) - guitar
 Joey Blowey (Joe Cannizzaro) - bass guitar
 Ozzy Ozmond (Tony TV) - drums

External links
 Let It Be

Green Jellÿ albums
1984 debut EPs